William Austin Whiting (August 5, 1855 – January 18, 1908) was an American lawyer and politician of the Kingdom, Republic, and Territory of Hawaii. He served as Attorney General of Hawaii and was an associate justice of the Supreme Court of Hawaii. During his college years, he was captain of the 1875 Harvard Crimson football team.

Life and career 
Whiting was born August 5, 1855, in Charlestown, Massachusetts. His ancestors included Massachusetts colonial governors Thomas Dudley and Simon Bradstreet, and Reverend John Cotton. He became a sixth generation Harvard College graduate, and served as captain of the 1875 Harvard Crimson football team. After graduating Harvard, he became a lawyer and practiced in Boston and Charlestown.

Whiting resettled in the Hawaiian Islands in 1880 where his uncle James W. Austin was an associate justice of the Supreme Court of the Kingdom of Hawaii. He continued his law practice in Honolulu. In 1891, the newly enthroned Queen Liliuokalani appointed him as Attorney General succeeding Arthur P. Peterson of the hold-over cabinet from the reign of King Kalākaua. As a cabinet minister, he sat as a member of the House of Nobles, the upper body of the legislature of the kingdom. Considered a tool of the queen by her opposition, Whiting lost popularity for his defense of the controversial Marshal Charles Burnett Wilson, a favorite of the queen and subordinate of the Attorney General. Whiting resigned on July 27, 1892, and was replaced by Paul Neumann.

On January 11, 1893, he was appointed First Judge of the First Circuit Court. Six days later, the monarchy was overthrown by pro-American elements in Hawaii. Whiting continued his position under the successive new regimes. Following the unsuccessful Royalist counter-revolution, Whiting headed the military tribunal which sentenced Liliuokalani for misprision of treason. In this capacity, he was given the rank of Colonel by the Republic of Hawaii. The trial was held in the former throne room of the ʻIolani Palace. The deposed queen was defended by Paul Neumann. She claimed ignorance but was sentenced to five years of hard labor in prison by the military tribunal and fined $5,000. The sentence was commuted on September 4, 1895 to imprisonment in an upstairs bedroom of ʻIolani Palace.

Whiting continued working as a circuit court judge until his elevation to the Supreme Court. On January 11, 1896, he was appointed Second Associate Justice of the Supreme Court of the Republic of Hawaii succeeding the vacant seat left by the death of Richard Frederick Bickerton. He held this position until the annexation of Hawaii and the organization of the Territory of Hawaii on July 14, 1900. After retiring from politics, he returned to his private law practice. Judge Whiting died on January 18, 1908; the cause of death was "dropsy caused by cirrhosis of the liver".

Personal life 
He had a common-law marriage with Lizzie Nakanealoha (1853–1929), a Native Hawaiian and the daughter of Luahine Kahiliopua Manuel (1831–1910).
They had three children: Lizzie Maunakapu Whiting (born 1885), who married Carlos A. Long; Ethel Hakula Whiting (born 1887) and Austin Whiting (born 1889).
Her relationship with Whiting ended sometime after 1889. Nakanealoha remained a loyal supporter of Queen Liliuokalani. She served as the caretaker of Uluhaimalama, a garden planted by Liliuokalani after the overthrow in the Pauoa Valley of Honolulu, and brought flowers wrapped in newspaper to the queen during her imprisonment. Later sources attributed their separation to Whiting's involvement in the 1895 trial of the queen. However, by at least 1895, she had already been married to a man named John Manā and lived with him in the Pauoa Valley.
Nakanealoha and John Manā were both named as devisees in Liliuokalani's deed of trust and were given the "premises on Ohua Lane, Waikiki, designated on the Map of Hamohamo as Lot No. Two (2); reversion to the Trustees."

References

Bibliography

External links

"A List of All the Cabinet Ministers Who Have Held Office in the Hawaiian Kingdom"

Includes a list of Attorneys General for the Kingdom of Hawaii, their salaries and budgets

American football running backs
19th-century players of American football
Harvard Crimson football players
Harvard College alumni
Players of American football from Massachusetts
People from Charlestown, Boston
Massachusetts lawyers
Hawaii lawyers
Hawaiian Kingdom Attorneys General
Hawaiian Kingdom politicians
Republic of Hawaii politicians
Hawaii politicians
Justices of the Hawaii Supreme Court
Hawaiian Kingdom judges
Territory of Hawaii judges